Tsurumaki may refer to:

Tsurumaki, a traditional woven Japanese bowstring holder
Tsurumaki (surname), a Japanese surname
Tsurumaki Domain, a feudal domain of Japan